FCV Farul II Constanța, commonly known as Farul II Constanța  or simply Farul II, is the reserve squad of Romanian first league side, Farul Constanța.

History
The team was originally founded in 2003, under the name of FC Farul II Constanța and was enrolled in the Divizia C. Farul II played in the third tier until 2010, without notable results, but the main target of the team was tho grew up talented players for the senior squad of Farul.

On 21 June 2021, Gheorghe Hagi, owner and founder of Viitorul Constanța, Gheorghe Popescu, chairman of Viitorul, and Ciprian Marica, owner of Farul Constanța, announced in a press conference that their teams have merged. The club that would continue in the Liga I will be Farul, while Viitorul virtually disappeared in the process of merger. Another result of this merge was that Farul II was also refounded and subsequently took Liga III place from Viitorul II Constanța.

Ground

Farul II Constanța use to play its home matches on Stadionul Farul in Constanța. Originally known as Stadionul 1 Mai, the stadium was opened in 1955 and had the shape of the letter "U", but subsequently it was expanded with another stand, finally reaching the capacity of 15,520 seats.

In 1970, Stadionul Farul became the first stadium in Romania to have floodlights installed.

Farul II also plays some of its home matches on Viitorul Stadium.

Players

Second team squad

Out on loan

Club officials

Board of directors

 Last updated: 17 January 2022
 Source: Board of Directors

Current technical staff

 Last updated: 8 March 2022
 Source: Technical Staff

League history

References

External links

Football clubs in Constanța County
Sport in Constanța
FCV Farul Constanța
Association football clubs established in 2003
Liga III clubs
2003 establishments in Romania